Gobeille v. Liberty Mutual Insurance Company, 577 U.S. ___ (2016), was a United States Supreme Court case in which the Court held that a Vermont state law requiring the disclosure of certain information relating to health care services was preempted by the Employee Retirement Income Security Act (ERISA) to the extent that the state law applied to ERISA plans. Writing for a majority of the Court, Justice Anthony Kennedy held that the Vermont law "impose[d] duties that are inconsistent with the central design of ERISA, which is to provide a single uniform national scheme for the administration of ERISA plans without interference from laws of the several States".

References

External links
 

United States Supreme Court cases
United States Supreme Court cases of the Roberts Court
2016 in United States case law
Liberty Mutual